Francisco José Medrano Magaña (born July 14, 1983, in San Salvador, El Salvador) is a former footballer who played as a midfielder. His last team was Sonsonate F.C,

Club career
Medrano joined Alianza Reserves from San Luis Talpa Reserves in 2001 and was barely used for the seniors in the next season, prompting him to leave for Luis Ángel Firpo where he did get significant playing time. In 2010, he moved to Águila, but again he did not play regularly and joined Once Municipal for the 2011 Clausura, only for them to be relegated.

Futsal carrer
After leaving Primera División de Fútbol de El Salvador due to economic reasons, Medrano began his Futsal career achieving his first championship with Inter Sivar F.C. in 2021 Medrano along his team won Salvadoran Futsal Second Division earning his pass to Premier League.

On February 2021 was convoqued to play the qualification stage for FIFA Futsal World Cup.

International career
Medrano made his debut for El Salvador in an August 2007 friendly match against Honduras, coming on as a substitute for Eliseo Quintanilla. As of July 2011, he has not played any more internationals.

References

External links

1983 births
Living people
Sportspeople from San Salvador
Association football midfielders
Salvadoran footballers
El Salvador international footballers
Alianza F.C. footballers
C.D. Luis Ángel Firpo footballers
C.D. Águila footballers
Once Municipal footballers
Santa Tecla F.C. footballers